Bathycongrus parapolyporus is an eel in the family Congridae (conger/garden eels). It was described by Emma Stanislavovna Karmovskaya in 2009. It is a tropical, marine eel which is known from the western central Pacific Ocean, including Fiji, Lakeba Island, the South China Sea, and Vietnam. It is known to dwell at a depth of 310 metres. Females can reach a maximum total length of 34.8 centimetres.

The species epithet "parapolyporus" means "near to many pored" in Ancient Greek, and refers to the species' similar features to Bathycongrus polyporus.

References

parapolyporus
Fish described in 2009